The Dominion Building (originally Dominion Trust Building) is a commercial building in Vancouver, British Columbia, Canada. Located on the edge of Gastown (207 West Hastings St), it was Vancouver's first steel-framed high-rise. At 53 m (175 ft), the thirteen-storey, Second Empire style building was the tallest commercial building in the British Empire upon its completion in 1910. Its architect was John S. Helyer, who is said to have died after falling off the staircase in the front of the building, though this is an urban legend.

The financiers of the structure were the Counts von Alvensleben from Germany, who were active in Vancouver's financial scene at the time.  It was generally held at the time that they were a front for the Kaiser's money, which carried the suggestion that the Empire's tallest building had been built by its greatest rival.

Today it is a provincially designated Class "A" heritage structure.

Owned by Newton Investments Limited, it was restored by restoration expert Read Jones Christofferson. The building's current tenants include a film production company (Haddock), a law firm, clothing designers, record labels, antiquarian booksellers, Kokoro Dance, professional web developers, marketing agency, Bowery Creative, the office of the Green Party of Vancouver, a dentist, non-profit organizations such as Living Oceans Society and Fair Trade Vancouver and a Lebanese restaurant, Nuba.

The Dominion Building sits across the street from Victory Square, site of the former provincial courthouse, which was relocated to Georgia Street in 1913.  The Dominion Building was at the hub of the city's financial and legal district until that move.

The backside of the building (containing the emergency staircases) and Cambie Street was filmed during the street scenes of The Neverending Story. It can be seen from Water Street.

The Dominion Building, as well as other elements of Victory Square, were filmed for scenes in an abandoned city in Battlestar Galactica.

The initial rooftop chase scene from Blade: Trinity was shot at the Dominion building.

The 2012 TV show Alcatraz also used this as a location in the opening episode, although the program was set in San Francisco, a lot of the location work was done in Vancouver. The Dominion building can also be seen in the background later in the series when a landmine is found in Victory Square.

Can Lit. author Timothy Taylor. maintains a writing office in this building.

See also
List of tallest and other historical buildings in Vancouver
Woodward's 43 - a nearby skyscraper echoing the design of the Dominion Building.

References

In television and film

In The NeverEnding Story (film), Building is seen in closing scene, when Bastian is flying with Falkor, to get some revenge over the kids.

External links

 Oakes Weekly
 Dominion Building restoration
 Dominion Building

Buildings and structures in Vancouver
Skyscrapers in Vancouver
Historic bank buildings in Canada
Buildings and structures completed in 1910
Second Empire architecture in Canada
Skyscraper office buildings in Canada